Chikhachevo or Chikhachyovo is the name of several rural localities in Russia:
Chikhachevo, Ivanovo Oblast, a village in Verkhnelandekhovsky District of Ivanovo Oblast
Chikhachevo, Krasnoyarsk Krai, a village in Kazantsevsky Selsoviet of Shushensky District of Krasnoyarsk Krai
Chikhachyovo, Bezhanitsky District, Pskov Oblast, a selo in Bezhanitsky District, Pskov Oblast
Chikhachyovo, Velikoluksky District, Pskov Oblast, a village in Velikoluksky District, Pskov Oblast